Hans-Werner Wanzlick (1917-1988) was a German chemist. A Professor of chemistry at the Berlin Technical University he  is notable for work on persistent carbenes and for proposing the Wanzlick equilibrium between saturated imidazolin-2-ylidenes and their dimers  — which he called "das doppelte Lottchen", after a 1949 novel by Erich Kästner about a pair of mischievous twins.

References

 Hans-Werner Wanzlick (1958), letter to Linus Pauling (in German).  Linus Pauling's Correspondence, item #444.6.

Academic staff of the Technical University of Berlin
1917 births
1988 deaths
20th-century German chemists